St Lawrence railway station may refer to:

St Lawrence railway station (Isle of Wight), UK (closed in 1952)
St Lawrence for Pegwell Bay railway station, Kent, UK (closed in 1916)
St Lawrence railway station, Queensland, Australia
St. Lawrence Avenue (IRT Pelham Line), a New York City Subway station in the Bronx, New York
St Lawrence Police Station, in St Lawrence, Queensland

See also
Lawrence Station (disambiguation)